This is a list of singles that charted in the top ten of the Billboard Hot 100 during 2004.

Usher scored five top ten hits during the year with "Yeah!", "Burn", "Confessions Part II", "My Boo", and "Lovers & Friends", the most among all other artists.

Top-ten singles
Key
 – indicates single's top 10 entry was also its Hot 100 debut

2003 peaks

2005 peaks

See also
 2004 in music
 List of Hot 100 number-one singles of 2004 (U.S.)
 Billboard Year-End Hot 100 singles of 2004

Notes
The single re-entered the Top 10 on the week ending February 7, 2004.
The single re-entered the Top 10 on the week ending May 22, 2004.
The single re-entered the Top 10 on the week ending June 26, 2004.
The single re-entered the Top 10 on the week ending December 25, 2004.

References

General sources

Joel Whitburn Presents the Billboard Hot 100 Charts: The 2000s
Additional information obtained can be verified within Billboard's online archive services and print editions of the magazine.

2004
United States Hot 100 top ten